Massachusetts Route 7A (MA 7A) is a state highway and alternate to U.S. Route 7 (US 7) in Berkshire County, Massachusetts. Between these segments, Route 7A is coextensive with US 7.

Both segments of Route 7A follow former alignments of US 7.

Route description

From its southern terminus to its northern one, Route 7A spans .

Southern segment

Northern segment
It heads northward along Kemble Street, passing the site of Shakespeare & Company before meeting Route 183 (Walker Street) within the CDP of Lenox. The two routes continue north along Walker Street for a brief  concurrency before Route 183 bears south towards Tanglewood. Route 7A continues northward through Lenox Village along Main Street, ending finally at its parent route approximately  northward.

History
The bypass routing of US 7 around Lenox Village, which gave way to the northern segment of Route 7A, was made as part of a failed attempt to make that route a freeway to Lanesborough.

Major intersections

References

007A
Transportation in Berkshire County, Massachusetts
U.S. Route 7